Myriam Bregman (born 25 February 1972) is an Argentine lawyer, activist and politician. While studying a degree in law at the University of Buenos Aires in the 90s, Bregman joined the Socialist Workers' Party (PTS), a Trotskyist Argentine party of which she is among the most prominent members.

She was one of the lawyers who took the case of Jorge Julio López, an eyewitness of the Dictatorship who disappeared in 2006 after testifying against Miguel Osvaldo Etchecolatz, who was sentenced to life imprisonment and charged with genocide accusations for the crimes he committed during the Dictatorship.

In 1997 she founded the Professionist Center for Human Rights (CeProDH), which defends and assesses laid off and unemployed workers and intervenes against repression and impunity, and the Justicia Ya! (Justice Now) Collective, who are appellants in cases of crimes against humanity during the dictatorship's regime of state terrorism.

She first ran for a seat in Congress in 2009 and for Chief of government of the City of Buenos Aires in 2011 and 2015 by the Workers' Left Front (comprising, among others, the PTS). In 2015 she became a national deputy for Buenos Aires Province, holding the seat by rotation for the Workers' Left Front (FIT) until 2016 and being widely supported by several sectors. Since December 2017, she is a deputy in the legislature for the City of Buenos Aires, where she's president of the Human Rights and Anti-Discrimination Commission. She also ran as vice-presidential candidate for the Front in the 2015 Argentine general election, coming fourth. In 2021 she was again elected to the national Chamber of Deputies, this time for the Autonomous City of Buenos Aires.

Cases on working people's rights 
Myriam Bregman has participated in defending and assessing employed and unemployed workers in Buenos Aires City and in the provinces of Buenos Aires and Neuquén.

Since 1998, she is a lawyer of the Zanon tile factory in Neuquén, being among those who acted in the historical case where the Zanón tile company was found guilty of issuing an "offensive lock out".

She also stood out in the defense of Catalina Balaguer, a female PepsiCo worker and activist who was fired unjustly and was later reincorporated although she was not formally a union delegate ("de facto delegate"). Bregman also represented PepsiCo workers against the illegal closure of the Vicente López factory on June 20, 2017, and denounced attourney Gastón Larramendi, who ordered the factory's eviction a week earlier.

Cases against state repression and persecution 
Bregman has participated in several court cases defending activists and workers from police repression and political and trade union persecution. She is also part of Carla Lacorte's team of lawyers. Lacorte, victim of repression herself, is also a member of the CeProDH along with Bregman. Bregman also participates in the case investigation of Federal Police agent Américo Balbuena, who infiltrated social organizations to spy on them.

Cases on crimes against humanity 
Bregman participated among the appellants of the first trial made since the re-opening of the cases of crimes against humanity perpetrated by criminals of the Argentinian Dictatorship, that of former Buenos Aires police chief Miguel Osvaldo Etchecolatz, where Justicia Ya! La Plata in 2006 accused him of committing genocide. In the final stages of the trial, one of the eyewitnesses, Jorge Julio López, disappeared; afterwards, a case on his disappearance was opened and remains so. Bregman was also an appealing lawyer during the trial against Jorge “Tigre” Acosta, on the ESMA case.

She intervened on the oral trials against crimes committed in the Higher School of Mechanics of the Navy (ESMA mega-case) against prefect Héctor Febrés (2007), and in the second trial against 18 genocide criminals, representing, among others, the case of Rodolfo Walsh, Raimundo Villaflor and organisations such as the Former Disappeared Detainees Association (2009-2011).

Myriam Bregman was also an appealing lawyer during the oral trial against Cristian Federico Von Wernich in La Plata (2007), accusing him of crimes against humanity committed in Campo de Mayo, the “Floreal Avellaneda” case in San Martín, Province of Buenos Aires (2009), "Seré Mansion" case (against Buenos Aires and Mar del Plata repressors in 2008), among others.

In 2008 she was awarded by the Human Rights Commission of the Lawyers School of Buenos Aires. In 2016 Carlos Blaquier and Ledesma executives sent her an intimidatory letter as she prepared to travel to Jujuy to receive complaints of grave human rights violations in the province of then-governor Gerardo Morales. Bregman denounced that she received phone call threats in her office after her intervention in the Labour and Budget Commission where she questioned the first employment bill because she considered that it was a measure to legalise outsourcing.

Bregman is also among the people who founded and manage the Professionist Center for Human Rights (CeProDH).

Women's rights activist 
On 31 May 2018, Myriam Bregman assisted to the 15th day of debate on legalizing Abortion in Argentina in the Argentine Congress to present her position in favour of legalizing abortion by declaring that "we are proud to see many young people with the green handkerchief as their banner". She also took the opportunity to criticise the Catholic Church and La Plata Archbishop Héctor Aguer, who "has as their transmission band local governors, who negotiate with women's rights".

Personal life
Bregman is a Jewish atheist.

Electoral history

Executive

Legislative

References

External links

1972 births
Living people
Argentine activists
Argentine women activists
20th-century Argentine lawyers
Socialist Workers' Party (Argentina) politicians
Women members of the Argentine Chamber of Deputies
Members of the Argentine Chamber of Deputies elected in Buenos Aires
Members of the Argentine Chamber of Deputies elected in Buenos Aires Province
Jewish Argentine politicians
Politicians from Buenos Aires
University of Buenos Aires alumni
21st-century Argentine women politicians
21st-century Argentine politicians
Members of the Buenos Aires City Legislature
Women local politicians
Argentine women lawyers
21st-century Argentine lawyers